Chapelle-lez-Herlaimont is a municipality of Wallonia located in the province of Hainaut, Belgium. 

On January 1, 2018, Chapelle-lez-Herlaimont had a total population of 14,900. The total area is 18.10 km² which gives a population density of 820 inhabitants per km².

The municipality consists of the following districts: Chapelle-lez-Herlaimont, Godarville, and Piéton.

Famous inhabitants 
 Alphonse Briart, geologist

References

External links
 

Municipalities of Hainaut (province)